William Bolling may refer to:

 Bill Bolling (born 1957), Republican Lieutenant Governor of the US State of Virginia 
 William Bolling (British politician) (1785–1848), British Tory (and later Conservative) Member of Parliament for Bolton 1832–1841 and 1847–1848